Verticordia brachypoda is a flowering plant in the myrtle family, Myrtaceae and is endemic to the south-west of Western Australia. It is an irregularly branched shrub with narrow leaves crowded on side-branches, and cream-coloured or white flowers with pink, cream or white centres.

Description
Leaves near the flowers are slightly wider than those further down the branches.

Flowering time is from October to December.

Taxonomy and naming
Verticordia brachypoda was first formally described by Nikolai Turczaninow in 1847. The description was published in Bulletin de la Société impériale des naturalistes de Moscou from specimens collected by James Drummond. In 1904, Ludwig Diels described Verticordia stylotricha but that is now described as a taxonomic synonym. The specific epithet brachypoda is derived from the ancient Greek terms brachys (βραχύς), meaning "short" and pous, genitive podos (πούς, genitive ποδός) meaning "foot", referring to the length of the stalk supporting the inflorescence.

When Alex George reviewed the genus Verticordia in 1991, he placed this species in subgenus Verticordia, section Pilocosta along with V. huegelii and V. multiflora.

Distribution and habitat
This verticordia grows in sand, often with clay or gravel, often in association with other verticordias, in heath, shrubland or open woodland. It is widespread in areas between the Arrowsmith River, Wialki and Ravensthorpe in the Avon Wheatbelt, Coolgardie, Esperance Plains, Geraldton Sandplains and Mallee biogeographic regions.

Conservation
Verticordia brachypoda is classified as "not threatened" by the Western Australian Government Department of Parks and Wildlife.

Use in horticulture
This species of verticordia has been difficult to establish in cultivation but when successul is an attractive plant. In has been propagated from cuttings but germinating seeds has proven to be difficult. Its compact shape and long-lasting flowers indicate horticultural potential when the species' requirements are better understood.

References

brachypoda
Rosids of Western Australia
Eudicots of Western Australia
Plants described in 1847
Taxa named by Nikolai Turczaninow